The Allouez Water Department and Town Hall is located in Allouez, Wisconsin.

History
The building was constructed in 1947 to house a number of municipal functions. Among the events overseen in the building were incorporation of Allouez into a village. Government offices were relocated elsewhere in 1967.

References

City and town halls on the National Register of Historic Places in Wisconsin
National Register of Historic Places in Brown County, Wisconsin
Colonial Revival architecture in Wisconsin
Government buildings completed in 1947